The position of Secretary for Mines is a now defunct office in the United Kingdom Government, associated with the Board of Trade.

In 1929, the department took over responsibility for petroleum.

In 1940, the department was divided with Geoffrey Lloyd and Sir Alfred Faulkner becoming respectively Secretary and Permanent Under-Secretary for Petroleum and David Grenfell and Sir Alfred Hurst respectively Secretary and Permanent Under-Secretary for Mines.

On 11 June 1942, both these sub-departments of the Board of Trade were transferred to the new Ministry of Fuel and Power, which itself has been merged into later departments.

Secretaries for Mines, 1920–1945

Mines, Secretary for
Defunct ministerial offices in the United Kingdom